Aljmir Murati (born 18 September 1985) is a Swiss football player of Kosovar Albanian descent.

References

External links
 Profile on Football.ch 

1985 births
Living people
Swiss men's footballers
Expatriate footballers in Germany
TuS Koblenz players
FC La Chaux-de-Fonds players
SC Young Fellows Juventus players
SC Cham players
FC Winterthur players
Potenza S.C. players
Kosovan emigrants to Switzerland
Swiss people of Albanian descent
Association football forwards